Caio Ribeiro de Carvalho is a Brazilian paracanoeist. He participated at the 2016 Summer Paralympics in the paracanoeing competition, being awarded the bronze medal in the men's KL3 event.

References

External links 
Paralympic Games profile

Living people
Place of birth missing (living people)
Year of birth missing (living people)
Brazilian male canoeists
Paracanoeists of Brazil
Paracanoeists at the 2016 Summer Paralympics
Medalists at the 2016 Summer Paralympics
Paralympic medalists in paracanoe
Paralympic bronze medalists for Brazil
21st-century Brazilian people